The Ladies Open Dunakeszi was a tournament for professional female tennis players played on outdoor clay courts. The event was classified as a $60,000 ITF Women's Circuit tournament and was held in Dunakeszi, Hungary, only in 2017.

Past finals

Singles

Doubles

External links
 ITF search
 Official website

ITF Women's World Tennis Tour
Recurring sporting events established in 2017
Clay court tennis tournaments
Tennis tournaments in Hungary
Recurring sporting events disestablished in 2017
Defunct sports competitions in Hungary